Barry Davies (born 1937) is a British sports commentator.

Barry Davies may also refer to:

Barry Davies (rugby union, born 1981), Welsh rugby union footballer
Barry Davies (rugby union, born 1875), Wales international rugby player, capped 1896
Barry Davies (British Army soldier) (1944–2016), British Army infantry soldier
Barry M. Davies (born 1947), judge in the Supreme Court of British Columbia

See also
Barry Davis (disambiguation)